The Ellis Park Derby is an American Thoroughbred horse race held annually at Ellis Park Race Course in Henderson, Kentucky. Inaugurated in 2018, in 2020 it became a qualifying race for the Kentucky Derby with the winner receiving 50 points on the Road to the Kentucky Derby.

The race was contested at a distance of one mile in its first two runnings before being increased to a mile and one-eighth in 2020.

Winners

References

External link
 Race video 2020 Ellis Park Derby

Flat horse races for three-year-olds
Ungraded stakes races in the United States
Kentucky
Horse races in Kentucky
Recurring sporting events established in 2018
Ellis Park Race Course